Maxey-sur-Meuse (literally Maxey on Meuse) is a commune in the Vosges department in Grand Est in northeastern France.

Geography
Maxey-sur-Meuse is positioned in the north-west of the Vosges département, on the departmental frontier with the Meuse département. To the north east are Toul (34 kilometres / 21 miles) and Nancy (51 kilometres / 33 miles). Maxey is across the river Meuse from a road junction where traffic bound for Commercy continues in a northerly direction (RD964) while traffic for Bar-le-Duc turns to the north-west (RD966)

The (here relatively small) river Meuse flows through Maxey where it is joined by the waters from the Vair and three smaller streams, the Roises, the Vau and the Blanchonrupt.   The presence of all these water courses makes the village popular with anglers.

See also
Communes of the Vosges department

References

Communes of Vosges (department)